Dodgeball was a location-based social networking software provider for mobile devices. Users texted their location to the service, which then notified them of crushes, friends, friends' friends and interesting venues nearby. Google acquired Dodgeball in 2005 and discontinued it in 2009, replacing it with Google Latitude.

Overview
Dodgeball was founded in 2000 by New York University students Dennis Crowley and Alex Rainert. The company was acquired by Google in 2005. In April 2007, Crowley and Rainert left Google, with Crowley describing their experience there as "incredibly frustrating". After leaving Google, Crowley created a similar service known as Foursquare with the help of Naveen Selvadurai.

Dodgeball was available for the cities of Seattle, Portland, San Francisco, Los Angeles, Las Vegas, San Diego, Phoenix, Dallas–Fort Worth, Austin, Houston, New Orleans, Miami, Atlanta, Washington, D.C., Philadelphia, New York City, Boston, Detroit, Chicago, Madison, Minneapolis–St. Paul and Denver.

In January 2009 Vic Gundotra, Vice President of Engineering at Google, announced that the company would "discontinue Dodgeball.com in the next couple of months, after which this service will no longer be available." Dodgeball was shut down and succeeded in February 2009 by Google Latitude. Google Latitude was eventually shut down in 2013.

See also 
Location-based service
Mobile dating
Geosocial networking
Foursquare

References

External links
Dodgeball (archive)

Defunct websites
Geosocial networking
Discontinued_Google_acquisitions
Google acquisitions
Defunct social networking services
Internet properties established in 2000
Internet properties disestablished in 2009